This list of Georgia Southern University alumni includes graduates, non-graduate former students and current students of First District Agricultural and Mechanical School, Georgia Normal School, South Georgia Teacher's College, Georgia Southern College, and/or Georgia Southern University.

Georgia Southern University is a four-year, state-supported, university located in Statesboro, Georgia.

https://edurank.org/uni/georgia-southern-university/alumni/

Entertainment

Film, television and radio

Music

Sports

Business

Government and public service

Scientists and researchers

References

 

Georgia Southern University alumni